Vice Presidency for Women and Family Affairs is a cabinet-level position in Iran, headed by one of the vice presidents.

History 
Before the Iranian Revolution in 1979, only a woman served in a similar capacity. Mahnaz Afkhami assumed office as the government minister responsible for women's affairs under administration of Prime Minister Amir-Abbas Hoveyda.

Shahla Habibi was appointed as the head of newly-established 'Bureau of Women's Affairs' and advisor in 1992. Her deputy Masoumeh Ebtekar, was reportedly the "main driving-force" behind the office. The office was renamed to the 'Centre for Women's Participation Affairs' under administration Mohammad Khatami and remained an advisor position, with Zahra Shojaei was appointed as its head. Under Mahmoud Ahmadinejad, the office was renamed to the 'Center for Women and Family Affairs' in 2005, a change that signaled the conservative attitude towards the women. Nasrin Soltankhah, Zohreh Tabibzadeh-Nouri and Maryam Mojtahedzadeh served in the capacity of heading the office until 2013, when the officeholder was promoted to a Vice President.

Vice presidents

References 

Vice presidents of Iran
Women in Iran